This is a list of notable alumni from Old Dominion University in Norfolk, Virginia, United States.

References